Myanmar Motion Picture Organization is the official non-profit organisation for the Cinema of Burma. It was established on 8 March 1946.

Patron of Myanmar Motion Picture Organisation
 Bogalay Tint Aung, Musician and Opera Professional
 Maung Ko Ko, Musician
 U Tin Yu, Film Director
 U Myint Soe, Film Technician
 U Khin Zaw, Film Director
 U Nyunt Win, Film Actor
 U Sein Tin, Film Producer

Chairmans of Myanmar Motion Picture Organisation
 U Tin Ngwe 1946 to 1958
 U Chan Tun 1951 to 1952
 U Shwe Done Bi Aung 1962 to 1963
 U Tin Maung 1964 to 1966
 U Nyi Pu 1969 to 70 and 1971 to 1972
 U Chinn Sein 1974 to 1986
 U Myint Soe 1986 to 1988
 U Khin Zaw 1989 to 1991
 U Nyunt Win 1992 to 1994
 U Sein Tin 1994 to 2005
 U Kyi Soe Tun 2005 to 2007
 U Myint Thein Pe 2007 to 2012
 U Zin Wine 2012 to 2014
 U Lu Min 2014 to 2017
 U Zin Wine 2017 to 2019
 U Nyi Nyi Tun Lwin 2019 to  present

References
3. Myanmar Motion Picture Organization official web site www.myanmarmpo.org

Trade associations based in Myanmar
1946 establishments in Burma
Cinema of Myanmar
Organizations established in 1946
Entertainment industry associations